This page documents the tornadoes and tornado outbreaks of 1983, in the United States. Most tornadoes form in the U.S., although some events may take place internationally. Tornado statistics for older years like this often appear significantly lower than modern years due to fewer reports or confirmed tornadoes.

Synopsis

The 1983 season saw a relatively average number of tornadoes in the United States, but just four "violent" tornadoes (all F4) and the number killed by tornadoes, listed in official records was lower than average at just 34, and no tornado killed more than three people. However, local news media state that the Los Angeles tornado of March 1 killed nine people, even though none are listed in official records. Two notable outbreaks took place in May, but it was generally a much less destructive tornado season, particularly in the main tornado alley, which saw no tornadoes stronger than F3.

Events
Confirmed tornado total for the entire year 1983 in the United States.

January

There were 13 tornadoes confirmed in the US in January.

January 31-February 2

A large upper level through developed over New Mexico and produced a gargantuan-type storm system that contained a blizzard. Two people were killed in Louisiana in separate F3 tornadoes on January 31 and one person was killed by an F2 tornado in Florida, on February 2. 33 Tornadoes were confirmed in the outbreak.

February

There were 41 tornadoes confirmed in the US in February.

March
There were 71 tornadoes confirmed in the US in March.

March 1

An F2 tornado in Los Angeles, California hit just south of downtown, destroying property and causing 30 injuries,  While official records for this tornado list no fatalities, local news media have stated that nine people were killed.

March 17

A severe weather event struck South Florida. Although only two tornadoes were confirmed, there may have been at least five in the region and as many as 17 were reported. Two injuries were reported from the F2 tornado.

April
There were 65 tornadoes confirmed in the US in April.

April 1
Two were killed and 20 others were injured by an F4 tornado in Collinston, Louisiana. It was part of an outbreak that spawned 13 tornadoes.

April 9
Three people were killed by an F3 tornado in Inverness, Florida.

April 23
An F3 tornado tracked through Barnwell County, South Carolina without causing any fatalities.

April 29
One person was killed by an F3 tornado in Springfield, Missouri.

May
There were 249 tornadoes confirmed in the US in May, resulting in 14 fatalities.

May 1–2 (U.S. and Canada)
Two were killed by an F0 tornado in Illinois on May 1 and an F3 tornado in Linn, Missouri caused no fatalities. On May 2, five were killed by tornadoes in Ohio and New York, while outside the US, an F4 tornado in Reece's Corners, Ontario caused no fatalities.

May 12–23 

At least four tornadoes were confirmed every day between May 12 and May 23, with 157 tornadoes confirmed over 12 days in a prolific tornado outbreak sequence.

The outbreak started on May 12, with eight tornadoes confirmed in Kansas, Oklahoma and northwestern Texas. Two of the tornadoes were rated F2, both of which occurred in southwestern Oklahoma near the towns of Mangum and Blair. The next day, 32 tornadoes were confirmed, primarily in Oklahoma. One of the tornadoes was rated F3, which occurred near Kingfisher. Another F2 tornado caused a significant injury south of Sulphur, Oklahoma that same day. On May 14, four tornadoes were confirmed. An F3 tornado directly hit the city of Pine Bluff, Arkansas causing two significant injuries. Four more tornadoes would be confirmed on May 15, including another F3 tornado which struck New Brockton, Alabama. Nine more tornadoes would be confirmed on May 16, as the first storm system moved into the Atlantic Ocean. On May 17, another storm system moved into the Great Plains yet again, producing tornadoes in Oklahoma, Kansas, and Colorado. An F2 tornado occurred just north of El Reno, Oklahoma that afternoon. On May 18, 21 tornadoes were confirmed, with Louisiana and Mississippi being the most affected. Two F3 tornadoes were confirmed in Louisiana, near the towns of Newellton and Tallulah. 26 tornadoes were confirmed on May 19, with multiple F3 tornadoes striking northern Louisiana. On May 20–21 a tornado outbreak struck Southeast Texas, killing five people, three in Harris County alone. On May 22, an F3 tornado touched down in Emmitsburg, Maryland, causing no deaths or injuries. It was the third recorded F3 tornado in Maryland history. On May 23, the last day of the outbreak sequence, four weak tornadoes were confirmed in Texas and Pennsylvania. In total, six fatalities occurred throughout the entire outbreak sequence.

June
There were 178 tornadoes confirmed in the US in June and two fatalities, one in Texas the other in Oklahoma.

July
There were 99 tornadoes confirmed in the US in July. An F3 tornado in Ocean County, New Jersey caused no fatalities or injuries while tornado–related fatalities were recorded in Michigan and Montana.

July 3
An outbreak in the Upper Mississippi Valley resulted in 26 tornadoes, including two F4 tornadoes in Andover, Minnesota and Dodgeville, Wisconsin. There were no fatalities.

July 8 (Canada)
An F3 tornado hit the city of Lloydminster, Alberta and Saskatchewan, causing over $1 million worth of damages.

July 21
Two people were killed by an F2 tornado in Hartly, Delaware while nine others were injured. As of 2022, this is deadliest tornado ever recorded in the state of Delaware.

August
There were 76 tornadoes confirmed in the US in August.

August 2 (Italy and USSR)

Four tornadoes struck Italy, killing two people and injuring two others, with a fifth tornado impacting the Soviet Union.

September
There were 19 tornadoes confirmed in the US in September.

September 8 (Lithuanian Soviet Socialist Republic)
A significant tornado struck the town of Birzai, located in modern day Lithuania. The European Severe Storms Laboratory rated the tornado F2 with a note that a damage survey occurred by a severe weather expert, but gave no further information.

October
There were 13 tornadoes confirmed in the US in October.

October 13
An F2 tornado in Maryland touched down in St. Mary's County (near Hollywood) and tracked through Calvert County, dissipating near Broomes Island. It was the only significant tornado to hit St. Mary's County since tornado records began in 1950.

November
There were 49 tornadoes confirmed in the US in November.

November 15
A F3 tornado impacted areas around Cullman, Alabama, injuring 19 people. Further down the path, a frame-home was completely leveled.

December
There were 58 tornadoes confirmed in the US in December.

December 3 
Two were killed and 51 others were injured by an F3 tornado in Oxford, Alabama.

December 6
An F3 tornado moved through part of Selma, Alabama, causing damage to the Selma University campus. One person died when the wall of an apartment caved in and nineteen others were injured. An F4 tornado struck LaPlace, Louisiana, where it destroyed 25-30 homes and injured 25 people. Several homes were wiped clean off their foundations, but they were not well-anchored, which precluded an F5 rating.

December 10
A tornado caused fatalities in Independence, Texas.

See also
 Tornado
 Tornadoes by year
 Tornado records
 Tornado climatology
 Tornado myths
 List of tornado outbreaks
 List of F5 and EF5 tornadoes
 List of North American tornadoes and tornado outbreaks
 List of 21st-century Canadian tornadoes and tornado outbreaks
 List of European tornadoes and tornado outbreaks
 List of tornadoes and tornado outbreaks in Asia
 List of Southern Hemisphere tornadoes and tornado outbreaks
 List of tornadoes striking downtown areas
 Tornado intensity
 Fujita scale
 Enhanced Fujita scale

References

External links
 U.S. tornadoes in 1983 - Tornado History Project
 Tornadoes and Deaths by year and month
 Tornado deaths monthly

 
1983 meteorology
Tornado-related lists by year
1983-related lists